Magos y Gigantes (known as Wizards and Giants in English) is a 2003 Mexican animated fantasy-comedy film produced by Ánima Estudios and 20th Century Fox (now known as 20th Century Studios) and released on November 19, 2003. This is the first feature film from Ánima Estudios and the first theatrically released animated film created with Adobe Flash, a program often used for internet cartoons. It was also the first Mexican animated feature in 30 years.

An animated series loosely based on this film, Awesome Magical Tales (formerly Teenage Fairytale Dropouts), premiered on Seven Network in Australia on December 31, 2012.

Plot summary
Magos y Gigantes tells the story of Gigante, a vertically challenged giant, Ada, a fairy whose wings have yet to blossom, and Trafalgar, a curious-looking little wizard, and their adventures while attending the biggest magic tournament in the land of Reino Magico. Mayhem ensues when Titan Caradura, an evil wizard, is disqualified from the tournament and seeks revenge by hatching up an elaborate plan to steal the magic powers from all the inhabitants of Reino Magico.

Cast
Xochitl Ugarte as Gigante, a young giant who didn't grow up to be one.
Rossy Aguirre as Ada, a fairy who can't fly.
Rubén Trujillo as Trafalgar, a clumsy magician who cast spells incorrectly.
Arath de la Torre as Titán Caradura
Francisco Colmenero as Mago Enigma
Miguel Couturier as Omega / Guardaespaldas 1
Eduardo Garza as Jack in the Box
Juan Ramón Huerta as Alfa / Guardaespaldas 2
Moisés Iván Mora as Cochinito
Gaby Ugarte as Princesa Luna

Release
The film was released in theaters on November 19, 2003 in Mexico, produced by Ánima Estudios and distributed by 20th Century Fox Mexico. The film was produced in flash animation, which is the first animated film to be released theatrically, using that animation.

Box office
The film opened #4 behind The Matrix Revolutions, Freaky Friday, and 21 Grams, grossing $4,531,492 pesos ($398,023 USD) on its opening weekend in Mexico. The film later bombed at the domestic box office, due to an unsuccessful competition with more-successful animated releases in Mexico.

Music

References

External links
Official Website (in Spanish)

2003 films
2003 animated films
Mexican animated films
2000s children's fantasy films
Ánima Estudios films
Flash animated films
20th Century Fox animated films
20th Century Fox films
2000s American films
2000s Mexican films